
Gmina Mszana Dolna is a rural gmina (administrative district) in Limanowa County, Lesser Poland Voivodeship, in southern Poland. Its seat is the town of Mszana Dolna, although the town is not part of the territory of the gmina.

Villages
Gmina Mszana Dolna contains the villages and settlements of Glisne, Kasina Wielka, Kasinka Mała, Łętowe, Łostówka, Lubomierz, Mszana Górna Raba Niżna and

Neighbouring gminas
Gmina Mszana Dolna is bordered by the town of Mszana Dolna and by the gminas of Dobra, Kamienica, Lubień, Niedźwiedź, Pcim, Rabka-Zdrój and Wiśniowa.

References
 Polish official population figures 2006

Mszana Dolna
Limanowa County